

Events

1950-1959
28 February 1959 - Discoverer 1 I/CORONA is launched; mission is a failure due to problems with Agena upper stage

1960-1969
15 January 1960 - 6594th Test Wing (Satellite) activated at Sunnyvale, California; will later be known as Air Force Satellite Control Facility, or the Blue Cube, controlling many NRO CORONA satellite missions
22 June 1960 - Launch of GRAB Signals Intelligence satellite; first overhead intelligence gathering satellite
11 August 1960 - Discoverer XIII capsule successfully recovered; first man-made object retrieved from orbit (American flag)
18 August 1960 - Discoverer XIV/CORONA M9009 launched; first totally successful mission; returned images of Mys Schmidta airfield
17 February 1961 - First launch of KH-5 ARGON camera system (M9014A); mission was partially successful
6 September 1961 - National Reconnaissance Office is established
13 December 1962 - First launch of POPPY SIGINT satellite
21 August 1964 - Last launch of KH-5 ARGON system (M9066A); mission was successful

1970-1979
25 May 1972 - CORONA M1117 launched; final mission of CORONA program
12 October 1973 - Existence of NRO is inadvertently leaked through the Congressional Record, an official government publication
15 August 1978 - William P. Kampiles, CIA staffer, arrested after selling KH-11 Technical Manual to the Soviets
1 October 1978 - President Jimmy Carter publicly acknowledges the "fact of" United States' photoreconnaissance satellites

1980-1989
28 January 1986 - STS-51L Challenger explodes; delays pending launches of NRO satellites

1990-1999
18 September 1992 - National Reconnaissance Office declassified

2000-2009
23 August 2001 - Brian Patrick Regan, a contractor at NRO, was arrested by FBI, under suspicion of espionage
23 April 2007 - Operating Division-4 (OD-4) inactivates at Onizuka AFS, California

References

External links
 NRO official website
 History of the US high-altitude SIGINT system
 History of the US reconnaissance system: imagery

National Reconnaissance Office